Isiah Kiner-Falefa (born March 23, 1995), often abbreviated as IKF, is an American professional baseball shortstop for the New York Yankees of Major League Baseball (MLB). He previously played in MLB for the Texas Rangers from 2018 to 2021.

Kiner-Falefa was born in raised in Hawaii where he attended Mid-Pacific Institute in Honolulu. Out of high school, he was drafted by the Texas Rangers in the fourth round of the 2013 Major League Baseball draft. After spending five seasons in the Rangers farm system, Kiner-Falefa made his major league debut in April 2018. In 2020, he won the American League Gold Glove Award at third base. In 2020 and 2021, he led the Rangers in several statistical batting categories. Prior to the 2022 season, Kiner-Falefa was sent to the Minnesota Twins but was flipped to the Yankees the following day as part of a multi-player trade.

Professional career

Minor leagues
Kiner-Falefa attended Mid-Pacific Institute in Honolulu, Hawaii. He was drafted by the Texas Rangers in the fourth round of the 2013 Major League Baseball Draft. 

He made his professional debut with the Arizona League Rangers and spent all of 2013 there, batting .322 with 11 RBIs and 12 stolen bases in 41 games. In 2014, he played for the AZL Rangers, Hickory Crawdads, and Spokane Indians where he batted .246 with 16 RBIs in 79 games, and in 2015, he played with Hickory and the High Desert Mavericks, where he batted .296 with 40 RBIs in 98 games. Kiner-Falefa spent 2016 with the Frisco RoughRiders where he compiled a .256 batting average with 27 RBIs in 108 games.

Kiner-Falefa played numerous positions in the Rangers organization, including shortstop, second base, third base and catcher. He played in 2017 with Frisco where he batted .288 with five home runs and 48 RBIs in 129 games. The Rangers added him to their 40-man roster after the 2017 season. He opened the 2018 season with the Round Rock Express, appearing in five games before being recalled to the major leagues for the rest of the season.

Texas Rangers
Kiner-Falefa made his Major League debut against the Los Angeles Angels on April 10, 2018. On April 14, against the Houston Astros, he hit his first career home run. Kiner-Falefa appeared in 111 games during his rookie season of 2018, hitting .261/.325/.357/.682 with 4 home runs and 34 RBI, while playing games at catcher, third base, shortstop, and second base. He opened the 2019 season with Rangers in a catching tandem with veteran Jeff Mathis. Kiner-Falefa was placed on the injured list on June 7, and recalled on August 2 in the role of utility infielder and third string catcher. He finished 2019 hitting .238/.299/.322 with one home run and 21 RBI.

In the pandemic-shortened 2020 season, Kiner-Falefa hit .280/.329/.370 with 3 home runs and 10 RBI in 58 games. He was awarded the AL Gold Glove Award for third basemen. Over 158 games in 2021, he hit .271/.312/.357/.670 with 8 home runs, 53 RBI, and 20 stolen bases. He led the major leagues with 136 singles. Defensively, he moved to shortstop and led his position with 436 assists and 98 double plays.

New York Yankees
On March 12, 2022, Texas traded Kiner-Falefa, along with pitcher Ronny Henríquez, to the Minnesota Twins for Mitch Garver. One day later, Minnesota traded Kiner-Falefa, along with Ben Rortvedt and Josh Donaldson, to the New York Yankees for Gary Sánchez and Gio Urshela.

Kiner-Falefa finished the 2022 season batting .261 with four home runs and 48 RBIs in 142 games.

Personal
Kiner-Falefa is of Samoan, Hawaiian, Japanese and Caucasian descent. He is the second cousin twice removed of Major League Baseball Hall of Famer Ralph Kiner on his mother's side. His great-great-grandmother was from Hiroshima, Japan.

References

External links

1995 births
Living people
American baseball players of Japanese descent
American people of Native Hawaiian descent
American sportspeople of Samoan descent
Arizona League Rangers players
Baseball players from Honolulu
Frisco RoughRiders players
Gold Glove Award winners
Hawaii people of Japanese descent
Hickory Crawdads players
High Desert Mavericks players
Major League Baseball catchers
Major League Baseball second basemen
Major League Baseball shortstops
Major League Baseball third basemen
Nashville Sounds players
New York Yankees players
Round Rock Express players
Spokane Indians players
Surprise Saguaros players
Texas Rangers players